Nadia Petrova and Meghann Shaughnessy were the defending champions, but Petrova had to forfeit the tournament due to a right pectoralis strain. Shaughnessy competed alongside Anna-Lena Grönefeld, but the pair withdrew in quarterfinals against Eleni Daniilidou and Jennifer Russell.

Lisa Raymond and Samantha Stosur won the title, defeating Gisela Dulko and Maria Kirilenko 6–2, 6–7(6–8), 6–1 in the final.

Seeds

Draw

Draw

External links
 Main and Qualifying Draws

Pilot Pen Tennis
2005 Pilot Pen Tennis